The National Arts Awards are presented by Americans for the Arts annually during National Arts & Humanities Month to distinguish private sector arts leadership.

Categories
The National Arts Awards are divided into the following categories:

 Arts Advocacy Award is presented to a noted artist or arts advocate with a track record of advocating for the arts.
 Arts Education Award is presented to a noted artist or arts advocate with a track record of contributing to the advancement of arts education.
 Corporate Citizenship in the Arts Award is presented to a high-profile, major corporate leader with a record of contributing to arts and cultural institutions or initiatives.
 Eli and Edythe Broad Award for Philanthropy in the Arts is presented to an individual with a demonstrable history of philanthropic giving to one or more major arts institutions.
 Isabella and Theodor Dalenson Lifetime Achievement Award is presented to a nationally recognized, established artist with a lifetime of exemplary artistic accomplishment in his or her field.
 The Bell Family Foundation Young Artist Award is presented to an individual who has achieved incredible accomplishments and exemplary leadership while still early in their careers.
 Outstanding Contributions to the Arts celebrates the artistic excellence of an established artist or arts advocate.
Kitty Carlisle Hart Award, Outstanding Contribution to the Arts Award, was awarded by the Arts & Business Council from 1996 to 2004, it became part of the National Arts Awards in 2005.

Recipients
Not all categories are awarded each year

Recipients before 1998

Arnold Gingrich Memorial Award

Arts Advocacy Award
Christopher Reeve

Arts Education Award

Corporate Citizenship in the Arts

Featured Artist

Kitty Carlisle Hart Award
Awarded by the Arts & Business Council from 1996 to 2004, it became part of the National Arts Awards in 2005.

Lifetime Achievement Award

Special Recognition

1998
 Alec Baldwin, Arts Advocacy Award
 Midori Gotō, Arts Education Award
 Isaac Stern, Colleen Dewhurst Lifetime Achievement Award
 Hugh McColl, Corporate Citizen Award
 Michael H. Jordan and CBS, Special tribute for outstanding vision and exemplary contributions to the arts in America

1999
 Hillary Clinton, Arts Advocacy Award
 Agnes Gund, Arts Education Award
 Sanford I. Weill, Corporate Citizen Award
 Jacob Lawrence, Lifetime Achievement Award
 Brooke Astor, Philanthropy Award

2000
 Wendy Wasserstein, Arts Advocacy Award
 Peter I. Bijur, Corporate Citizen Award
 Frank Gehry and Thomas Krens, Lifetime Achievement Award
 Jo Carole Lauder, Philanthropy Award
 Uma Thurman, Young Artist Special Recognition Award

2001
 Peter Martins, Artistic Leadership Award
 Michael Greene, Arts Advocacy Award
 The Honorable Schuyler Chapin, Arts Education Award
 Robert H. Benmosche, Corporate Citizen Award
 Richard Meier, Lifetime Achievement Award

2002
 Cindy Sherman, Artistic Excellence
 Alberto Vilar, Corporate Citizenship in the Arts
 David Rockefeller, Frederick R. Weisman Award for Philanthropy in the Arts
 Pinchas Zukerman, Isaac Stern Award for Excellence in Classical Music
 Dr. Robert S. Martin, Special Recognition for 25 Years of Service
 Kathleen A. Dore, Special Recognition for Excellence in Arts & Media
 Natalie Portman, Young Artist Award

2003
 Christo and Jeanne-Claude, Artistic Leadership
 Dr. Vance D. Coffman, Corporate Citizenship in the Arts
 Teresa Heinz, Frederick R. Weisman Award for Philanthropy in the Arts
 Richard Avedon, Lifetime Achievement
 Kirk Varnedoe, Special Memorial Tribute for Extraordinary Contributions to the Arts
 Sofia Coppola, Young Artist Award for Artistic Excellence

2004
 Chuck Close, Artistic Leadership and Arts Advocacy
 A.G. Lafley, Procter & Gamble, Corporate Citizenship in the Arts
 Raymond Nasher, Frederick R. Weisman Award for Philanthropy in the Arts
 Paul Taylor, Lifetime Achievement
 William Bassell, Principal, Long Island City High School, Special Arts Education Recognition Award
 Mena Suvari, Young Artist Award for Artistic Excellence

2005
 Pierre Dulaine and Yvonne Marceau, Arts Education Award
 Target Corporation, Corporate Citizenship in the Arts
 Eli Broad, Frederick R. Weisman Award for Philanthropy in the Arts
 Mikhail Baryshnikov, Kitty Carlisle Hart Award for Outstanding Contribution to the Arts
 John Baldessari, Lifetime Achievement Award
 Kerry Washington, Young Artist Award

2006
 Jeff Koons, Artistic Achievement Award
 United Technologies Corporation, Corporate Citizenship in the Arts Award
 Sheila C. Johnson, Frederick R. Weisman Award for Philanthropy in the Arts
 Aretha Franklin, Lifetime Achievement Award
 Kitty Carlisle Hart, Special Recognition for Outstanding Contributions to the Arts
 Jake Gyllenhaal, Young Artist Award

2007
 Music Industry and NAMM, Corporate Citizenship in the Arts Award
 Wallis Annenberg, Frederick R. Weisman Award for Philanthropy in the Arts
 Anna Deavere Smith, Kitty Carlisle Hart Award for Outstanding Contributions to the Arts
 Ellsworth Kelly, Lifetime Achievement Award
 The United States Conference of Mayors, Special Recognition in Honor of Its 75th Anniversary
 John Legend, Young Artist Award for Artistic Excellence

2008
 Phil Ramone, Arts Advocacy Award
 The Principal Financial Group, Corporate Citizenship in the Arts Award
 Joan W. Harris, Frederick R. Weisman Award for Philanthropy
 Yoko Ono, Kitty Carlisle Hart Award for Outstanding Contributions to the Arts
 Dame Julie Andrews, Lifetime Achievement Award
 Kehinde Wiley, Young Artist Award for Artistic Excellence

2009
 Ed Ruscha, Artistic Excellence Award
 Anne Finucane, Bank of America, Corporate Citizenship in the Arts Award
 Sidney Harman, Frederick R. Weisman Award for Philanthropy in the Arts
 Salman Rushdie, Kitty Carlisle Hart Award for Outstanding Contributions to the Arts
 Robert Redford, Lifetime Achievement Award

2010
 Martha Rivers Ingram, Eli and Edythe Broad Award for Philanthropy in the Arts
 Angela Lansbury, Lifetime Achievement Award
 Kate and Laura Mulleavy, Rodarte, Maria and Bill Bell Young Artist Award
 Herb Alpert, Outstanding Contributions to the Arts Award

2011
 Frank Stella, Isabella and Theodor Dalenson Lifetime Achievement Award
 Jenny Holzer, Outstanding Contributions to the Arts
 President's Committee on the Arts and Humanities, Arts Education Award
 Gabourey Sidibe, Bell Family Foundation Young Artist Award
 Beverley Taylor Sorenson, Eli and Edythe Broad Award for Philanthropy in the Arts
 Wells Fargo & Company, Corporate Citizenship in the Arts Award

2012
 Paul G. Allen, Eli and Edythe Broad Award for Philanthropy in the Arts
 James Rosenquist, Isabella and Theodor Dalenson Lifetime Achievement Award
 Brian Stokes Mitchell, Outstanding Contributions to the Arts Award
 Josh Groban, Bell Family Foundation Young Artist Award
 Lin Arison, Arts Education Award
 AXA Art Insurance Corporation, Corporate Citizenship in the Arts Award

2013
Dakota Fanning - Bell Family Foundation Young Artist Award
B.B. King – Isabella and Theodor Dalenson Lifetime Achievement Award
John and Mary Pappajohn – Eli & Edythe Broad Award for Philanthropy in the Arts
Joel Shapiro – Outstanding Contributions to the Arts Award
Alberto Carvalho – Arts Education Award

2014
Richard Serra - Lifetime Achievement Award
David Hallberg - Bell Family Foundation Young Artist Award
Norie Sato - Public Art Network Award
Malissa Feruzzi Shriver - Arts Education Award

2015
Lady Gaga - Young Artist Award

2016
Doug Aitken - Outstanding Contributions to the Arts Award
Esperanza Spalding - Ted Arison Young Artist Award

References

Arts awards in the United States